Metaphorical Music is Nujabes' first solo album released in 2003. It offers a combination of hip hop and instrumental jazz, and features artists like Shing02, Substantial, Five Deez and Cise Starr (of CYNE). Despite the fact that the album has contributing vocals from several artists, it is roughly classified as a breakbeat album.

Uyama Hiroto contributed to several notable tracks on the album, including "Letter from Yokosuka" and "Next View", and would appear on subsequent albums Modal Soul and Spiritual State. Metaphorical Music received universal acclaim from Nujabes' fans and critics alike.

Track listing

Sample credits:
 "Blessing It (Remix)" contains a sample of "Save Our Children" from the album Save Our Children by Pharoah Sanders
 "Horn in the Middle" contains a sample of "Joshua" from the album Seven Steps to Heaven by Miles Davis
 "Lady Brown" contains a sample of "The Shade of the Mango Tree" by Luiz Bonfá
 "Beat Laments the World" contains a sample from  Kip Hanrahan's "Make Love 2" and "Blessing It"
 "Think Different" contains a sample of "Live for Life (Vivre Pour Vivre)" from the soundtrack of Live for Life by Francis Lai
 "A Day by Atmosphere Supreme" contains a sample of "September Fifteenth (Dedicated to Bill Evans)" from the album As Falls Wichita, so Falls Wichita Falls by Pat Metheny and Lyle Mays
 "Latitude (Remix)" contains a sample of "Clouds" by Gigi Masin
 "F.I.L.O." contains a sample of "Deixa" by Baden Powell, played by Toquinho on "O Violão de Toquinho"
 "The Final View" contains a sample of "Love Theme From 'Spartacus'" from the album Eastern Sounds by Yusef Lateef

References

External links
 Metaphorical Music, release information at Last.fm

Albums produced by Nujabes
2003 debut albums
Nujabes albums
Instrumental albums
Instrumental hip hop albums